Aleksey Petrovich Yermolov (– ) was a Russian Imperial general of the 19th century who commanded Russian troops in the Caucasian War. He served in all the Russian campaigns against the French, except for the 1799 campaigns of Alexander Suvorov in northern Italy and Switzerland. During this time he was accused of conspiracy against Paul I and sentenced to exile. Two years later he was pardoned and brought back into service by Alexander I. Yermolov distinguished himself during the Napoleonic Wars at the Battles of Austerlitz, Eylau, Borodino, Kulm, and Paris. Afterwards he led the Russian conquest of the Caucasus and played a key role in the Circassian genocide.

Early life
Yermolov was born on 4 June 1777 in Moscow to a Russian noble family from the Oryol Governorate. He graduated from the boarding school of the Moscow University and enlisted in the Guards Preobrazhensky Regiment on 16 January 1787. Four years later, he was promoted to lieutenant and transferred to the Nizhegorod Dragoon Regiment with the rank of captain. He briefly taught at the Artillery and Engineer Cadet Corps in 1793 before being sent to fight the Polish insurgents in the Polish campaign of 1794. He participated in the assault on Praga and received the Order of St. George (4th class) on 12 January 1795. The next year, Yermolov took part in the Persian Campaign along the Caspian Sea. However, he was arrested on 7 January 1799 for alleged participation in conspiracy against Tsar Paul I and spent two years in exile to Kostroma, where he taught himself Latin.

After the assassination of Paul I in 1801, the new emperor, Alexander I, pardoned Yermolov, who returned to the military and began studying the works of Alexander Suvorov, whose disciple he now considered himself. Yermolov was appointed to the 8th Artillery Regiment on 13 May 1801; he then transferred to the horse artillery company on 21 June 1801.

Napoleonic Wars

His own military genius blossomed during the Napoleonic Wars. During the War of the Third Coalition, Yermolov served in the rear and advance guards and distinguished himself at Amstetten and Austerlitz. For his actions, he was promoted to colonel on 16 July 1806. The following year, he participated in the campaign in Poland, serving in Prince Bagration's advance guard. He distinguished himself commanding an artillery company in numerous rearguard actions during the retreat to Landsberg as well as in the Battle of Eylau. In June 1807, Yermolov commanded horse artillery company in the actions at Guttstadt and Deppen, Heilsberg and Friedland, being awarded the Order of St. George (3rd class, 7 September 1807). He was promoted to major general on 28 March 1808 and was appointed inspector of horse artillery companies. In early 1809, he inspected artillery companies of the Army of the Danube. Although his division took part in the 1809 campaign against Austria, Yermolov commanded the reserves in Volhynia and Podolsk gubernias, where he remained for the next two years. In 1811, he took command of the guard artillery company and in 1812, became the Chief of Staff of the First Western Army.

During the 1812 Campaign, Yermolov took part in the retreat to Smolensk and played an important role in the quarrel between Generals Barclay de Tolly and Bagration. He opposed Barclay's strategy and appealed to Emperor Alexander I to replace him with Bagration. After the Russian armies united on 2 August, Yermolov fought at Smolensk and Lubino (Valutina Gora) for which he was promoted to lieutenant general on 12 November 1812 with seniority dating from 16 August 1812. He distinguished himself at the Battle of Borodino, where he was lightly wounded leading a counterattack that recaptured the Great Redoubt. For his courage, Yermolov received the Order of St. Anna (1st class). During the rest of the campaign, he served as a duty officer in the headquarters of the main Russian army and fought at Maloyaroslavets. In October–November 1812, Yermolov served in the advance guard under Miloradovich and fought at Vyazma and Krasnyi. In late November, he commanded one of the detachments in the advance guard under General Rosen taking part in the combats on the Berezina. On 3 December 1812, he was recalled to the main headquarters where he became the Chief of Staff of the Russian army. Three weeks later, he was appointed commander of the artillery of the Russian armies.

During the European campaigns of 1813 and 1814, Yermolov was in charge of the artillery corps of the allies. His able command proved crucial to their success in the Battle of Kulm. In 1813, Yermolov fought at Lützen, where he was accused of insubordination and transferred to command the 2nd Guard Division. He then fought at Bautzen, commanding the Russian rearguard during the retreat, and at Kulm where he was decorated with the Prussian Iron Cross. In 1814, he distinguished himself in the battle around Paris and was awarded the Order of St. George on 7 April 1814.

Caucasus

Yermolov's main tasks were to secure Russia's hold over Georgia and the khanates recently taken from Persia, to occupy the Caucasus range separating the new territories from the rest of the Empire and to subdue the 'savage' and hostile Muslim tribes inhabiting it. But first he had another, most urgent task: Yermolov had to travel on a mission to Tehran, to evade the execution of Alexander I's promise to restore to Fat′h-Ali Shah Qajar part of the territories acquired by Russia in the Treaty of Gulistan of 1813

During his tenure as commander-in-chief in the Caucasus, Yermolov (by that time promoted to the rank of full artillery general) was responsible for robust Russian military policies in Caucasus, where his name became a byword for brutality. In a reply to the outraged Alexander I, he wrote, "I desire that the terror of my name shall guard our frontiers more potently than chains or fortresses." He was appointed commander-in-chief of the Russian forces in Georgia and commander of the Independent Georgian Corps on 21 April 1816. His promotion to the position was seen as a personal insult by his superiors and earned him many enemies at home. He proved himself an able administrator and successfully negotiated with Persia in 1818, receiving promotion to general of infantry on 4 March 1818.

In 1817, he fortified a ford on the Sunzha river and founded the fortress of Grozny the following year. After repelling an attack by the highlanders, he undertook a punitive raid against them. His decisive measures did succeed in keeping many of the allied tribes loyal.

For ten years he was both commander-in-chief of the Georgian armies and the imperial ambassador to Persia. His independent character would often lead him to conflicts with the Ministry of War, exacerbated by the personal antagonism of many of its members. He was adored by his soldiers, often fraternising with them, and generally successful in combatting the highlanders of Dagestan, but failed to prevent multiple uprisings.

When, in 1825, Yermolov found out that Alexander Griboyedov was about to be arrested on charges relating to the Decembrist revolt, he warned him of it, enabling Griboyedov to destroy some compromising papers and avoid arrest.

Yermolov's career came to an abrupt end in 1827 and he was replaced with Nicholas I's favorite, Ivan Paskevich. The exact reasons are unclear, but he was disliked by Nicholas and was blamed for not keeping the tribes in check. As Professor Moshe Gammer  writes: Far from subduing the population, as his admirers up to the present have asserted, his activities rather intensified hatred to Russia, stiffened resistance to it and helped to enhance the role of Islam, in the form of the spread of the Naqshbandi tariqa (Sufi brotherhood) which would leave now resistance in the eastern part of the Caucasus and for some periods of time in some of its western parts too.Yermolov was discharged on 7 December 1827 with a full pension. However, four years later, Nicholas restored him in the rank (6 November 1831) and appointed him to the State Council; Yermolov's rank of general of infantry was confirmed in 1833.

Retirement

During the last 30 years of his life, Yermolov lived in seclusion at his manor near Oryol. He was asked to lead a peasant militia during the Crimean War but declined on account of poor health.

Yermolov left very interesting and valuable memoirs on his service in 1796–1816. His Zapiski (Memoirs) are divided into three parts covering his early career, the Napoleonic Wars, and his service in the Caucasus. They were published posthumously in two volumes.

Awards
In addition to the decorations already mentioned, Yermolov was decorated with the Russian Orders of St. Andrew the First Called, of St. Vladimir (1st class), of St. Alexander Nevsky, of the White Eagle, and of St. Anna (1st class); foreign orders received included the Prussian Orders of the Red Eagle (1st class) and the Pour le Mérite, the Military Order of Maria Theresa (3rd class), the Baden Order of Karl Friedrich, the Persian Order of the Lion and the Sun, and two golden swords for courage (including one with diamonds).

Impact and trivia
Yermolov was one of the best artillery officers in the Russian army. He proved his abilities throughout the Napoleonic Wars and later in the Caucasus. However, he was also a shrewd and cunning courtier, who often intrigued against his superiors. Because of his enigmatic character, Yermolov was often described as the "Modern Sphinx". He proved himself a ruthless and effective ruler in the Caucasus.

He was a character in Leo Tolstoy's 1869 novel War and Peace, and in Prokofiev's opera of the same name, based on the novel.

Legacy
Yermolov is a highly controversial historical figure. He is respected by Russian people for his military skills, and hated by many Caucasus nations for his brutality.

In Russia, he was famous for military prowess, bravery and strategy. His charismatic leadership of imperial armies was romanticized in poems by Alexander Pushkin, Vasily Zhukovsky, and others.

However, in the Caucasus (with the exception of Ossetia), Yermolov is infamous for atrocities he had committed.

As Caucasus expert Charles King puts it:
"Ermolov was a quintessential frontier conqueror. He was the first to employ a comprehensive strategy for the subjugation of the Caucasus highlands, and his brutal methods would be used, in one form or another, by tsarists, Bolsheviks, and Russian generals into the twenty-first century.

"Ermolov was the most celebrated and, at the same time, the most hated of Russian commanders in the Caucasus theater. To St.Petersburg society he was the gallant, Latin-quoting senior officer. For generations of indigenous mountaineers he was the dreaded "Yarmul" who razed villages and slaughtered families. Although he gained the supreme confidence of one Tsar, Alexander I, he was treated with suspicion by another, Nicholas I. He was responsible for implementing a series of policies that were at the time hailed as vehicles for civilizing the benighted Caucasus frontier but today might very well be called state-sponsored terrorism."
This is how Baddeley described him in 1908:
"In person no less than in character Yermolov impressed all who came near him as one born to command. Of gigantic stature and uncommon physical strength, with round head set on mighty shoulders and framed in shaggy locks, there was something leonine in his whole appearance, which, coupled with unsurpassed courage, was well calculated to excite the admiration of his own men and strike terror into his semi-barbarous foes. Incorruptibly honest, simple, even rude in his habit, and of Spartan hardihood, his sword was ever at his side, and in city as in camp he slept wrapped only in his military cloak, and rose with the sun."

Since 2000, Kalach-on-don has been operating a multi-purpose ship of the KC-104-02 project named after the hero of the Patriotic war of 1812 — "General Yermolov", as an object of intangible heritage that preserves the historical memory of the people.

Notes

Further reading
In 2005, Ravenhall Books published his abridged memoirs under titles The Czar's General: The Memoirs of a Russian General by Alexey Yermolov, translated and edited by Alexander Mikaberidze.
 Gammer M. "Proconsul of the Caucasus": a Re-examination of Yermolov. Social Evolution & History 2(1): 177–194.

External links

All About Ermolov

1777 births
1861 deaths
Military personnel from Moscow
People from Moskovsky Uyezd
Members of the State Council (Russian Empire)
Generals of the infantry (Russian Empire)
Caucasus Viceroyalty (1801–1917)
Ambassadors of the Russian Empire to Iran
1820s in Georgia (country)
Decembrists
Members of the Russian Academy
Russian people of the Kościuszko Uprising
Russian commanders of the Napoleonic Wars
People of the Russo-Persian Wars
Russian military personnel of the Caucasian War
Circassian genocide perpetrators
Recipients of the Order of St. Anna, 1st class
Recipients of the Order of St. George of the Second Degree
Recipients of the Order of St. George of the Third Degree
Recipients of the Iron Cross (1813)
Recipients of the Order of St. Vladimir
Knights Cross of the Military Order of Maria Theresa
Recipients of the Pour le Mérite (military class)